Dr Robert de Bruce Trotter MB LRCPE LRCPSG (1833–1907) was a 19th-century Scottish physician remembered as an author and poet often writing under the pseudonym of Mrs Maria Trotter. Under the further pseudonym Saxon he "edited" his own texts. His books therefore appear as written by Mrs M Trotter and edited by Saxon. This presumably gave appeal and credibility to both male and female readers.

Life
He was born on 25 July 1834 in Dalbeattie in Galloway, the eldest of four sons to Robert de Bruce Trotter Sr, all sons becoming physicians. His mother was Martha ("Maria") Nithsdale. The family moved to Auchencairn soon after he was born. He was educated there then in 1846 went to work in a law office in Glasgow.

He left the law office to study Medicine at Glasgow University graduating MB ChB around 1854. As a physician he practiced in Galloway, and began collecting local folktales and anecdotes.

He retired to Tayview House, 2 Tay Street in Perth, Scotland.

He died in Perth on 3 December 1907 and is buried in Wellshill Cemetery in the north of the city. The grave lies on the south wall of the southern path linking to the Jeanfield section.

Family
He was married to Helen Finlay Baird (1851-1917).

Principal works
Galloway Gossip: Sixty Years ago (1877)
Galloway Gossip:The Southern Albanich Eighty Years Ago (1901)
In an attempt to reintroduce his work to a contemporary audience, selections from "Galloway Gossip" were included in the anthology "The Sound of our Voices" edited by Pete Fortune and Liz Niven, published by Dumfries and Galloway Libraries (2000). Further selections, and an essay on Trotter himself, by Pete Fortune, were published in the journal of the Scots Language Society, "Lallans" in 2001.

References

1830s births
1907 deaths
People from Dalbeattie
Scottish poets
Alumni of the University of Glasgow